Melvin Ray Hutchins (November 22, 1928 – December 19, 2018) was an American basketball player. He played professionally in the National Basketball Association (NBA) from 1951 to 1958. Hutchins was selected by the Tri-Cities Blackhawks with the second pick in the 1951 NBA draft and was a four-time NBA All-Star.

Early life
Hutchins was born in Sacramento, California and attended high school at Monrovia High School in Monrovia, California.

College career
A  power forward–center, Hutchins attended Brigham Young University in 1946–47 and 1947–48 as a freshman and sophomore, playing for coach Floyd Millet. After a one-year absence where he worked in Southern California, he returned to BYU in 1949–50 and 1950–51. As a senior, he led BYU to the 1951 NIT National Championship.

In 1950–1951, Hutchins averaged 15.4 points and 12.7 rebounds, as BYU finished 22–9 under coach Stan Watts. His 471 rebounds that season remain a BYU record.

At the conclusion of the 1951 season, Hutchins played in the annual East-West College All-Star game, where he was named MVP after leading the West to victory.

Professional career
Hutchins was selected by the Tri-Cities Blackhawks (later, the Milwaukee Hawks) with the second pick in the 1951 NBA draft. The first overall pick, Gene Melchiorre (Baltimore Bullets), received a lifetime ban from the NBA for gambling, therefore Hutchins was given a $7,000 bonus that was awarded to the top pick in the NBA Draft.

In 1952, as a rookie, Hutchins was the co-leader of the NBA in total rebounds with 880, averaging 13.3 rebounds per game, which is on the List of National Basketball Association rookie single-season rebounding leaders. As of 2018, Hutchins and Wilt Chamberlain are the only rookies in NBA history to lead the league in total rebounds. Hutchins and Bill Tosheff were named co-NBA Rookie of the Year by newspaper writers—a designation not currently recognized by the NBA, although it has appeared in the official NBA record book as recently as 1998.

Hutchins helped lead the Pistons to back-to-back NBA Finals in 1955 and 1956. During his career, Hutchins appeared in four NBA All-Star Games, (1953, 1954, 1956, and 1957), and finished fourth in MVP voting in 1956. He played for the Milwaukee Hawks, Fort Wayne Pistons, and New York Knicks.

Along with being one of the top rebounders in the NBA, Hutchins was renowned for his defense. 
During his Hall of Fame induction speech in August 2011, Satch Sanders said that Hutchins was one of the great defenders who inspired him to play defense at a high level: "He (Hutchins) was so smooth defensively, always in the right place", Sanders told CSNNE.com moments after delivering his acceptance speech. "I thought to myself, 'I sure hope one day I can play like that.'"

Hutchins suffered a severe knee injury that forced his retirement in 1958.

For his NBA career, he averaged a near double-double of 11.2 points, 9.6 rebounds and 3.0 assists over 437 games, totaling 4,851 career points and 4,186 career rebounds in seven seasons.

Personal life
Hutchins is the brother of 1952 Miss America winner Colleen Kay Hutchins. Hutchins' brother-in-law was NBA player Ernie Vandeweghe, the father of former two-time NBA All Star Kiki Vandeweghe.

An avid golfer, Hutchins gained recognition in amateur golf in northern California.

Following his NBA career, Hutchins worked in real estate.

Hutchins was married to the former Lorene Hardy, who died in 2010, with whom he had four children. Hutchins died on December 19, 2018, in  Encinitas, California, at the age of 90.

Honors
 In 1976, Hutchins was induced into the Brigham Young University Athletics Hall of Fame.
 Hutchins was inducted into the Sacramento Sports Hall of Fame.
 On February 16, 2013, Hutchins and his BYU teammate Roland Minson had their jerseys retired during a ceremony at half-time of a BYU and University of Portland basketball game.

NBA career statistics

Regular season

Playoffs

See also
List of National Basketball Association annual rebounding leaders

References

External links

1928 births
2018 deaths
All-American college men's basketball players
Amateur Athletic Union men's basketball players
American men's basketball players
Basketball players from Sacramento, California
BYU Cougars men's basketball players
Centers (basketball)
Fort Wayne Pistons players
Milwaukee Hawks players
National Basketball Association All-Stars
New York Knicks players
Power forwards (basketball)
Tri-Cities Blackhawks draft picks
Vandeweghe family